Herzliya railway station (Taḥanat HaRakevet Herzliya) is an Israel Railways passenger station located in the city of Herzliya. The station currently has three island platforms serving two tracks each. In the 2010s, the Ayalon Highway was extended past the station northwards (as part of the Route 531 project) so that the platforms lie contained in the median of the highway, like the train stations in Tel Aviv.

History
The station was built in the 2000s to replace the older station which was opened on 23 October 1989 that was located a few hundred meters to the south of the present location. The old station was itself a reconstruction of the original station, built in 1953 together with the Coastal Railway. Most of the trains which stop at the station are suburban trains on the Binyamina/Netanya–Tel Aviv–Rehovot/Ashkelon line.

Since 2020, it is also a part of the new circular route (Sharon Railway) that serves the city of Ra'anana to the northeast, as well as Bnei Brak–Ramat HaHayal, Petah Tikva, Rosh Ha-Ayin, Kfar Saba and Hod Hasharon stations. The Sharon Railway was built as part of the Route 531 construction project. The station will also serve as the northern terminus for trains operating on the Tel Aviv–Jerusalem railway for several years as the initial stage of Israel Railways' electrification program will end at the station.

As part of the Route 531 project the station was greatly expanded. Platform exits were added leading directly to the pedestrian bridge across the tracks located in the northern end of the station, the existing side platform was converted to an island platform, and a new island platform was built east of the existing platforms. After these works, which effectively doubled the size of the station, it contains a total of three island platforms serving a total of six tracks, tying with Tel Aviv Central for the largest number of platforms in Israel. The additional platforms are necessary in order to accommodate the additional trains the station will serve on the Sharon Railway loop and as the terminus of trains which use the Tel Aviv–Jerusalem railway.

Currently, entry to the station is possible from east of the tracks but in the future entry from the west will be built as well, including a new 290-space parking lot to be constructed west of the station, supplementing the existing eastern lot.

Train service

Station layout
Platform numbers increase in an East-to-West direction

Ridership

See also
Transportation in Israel

References

Railway stations in Tel Aviv District
Herzliya